Kenyata Allen Johnson (born February 1, 1978) is an American former professional basketball player. A 6'11" (211 cm) 240 lb (109 kg) center, he played collegiately at Ohio State University. He played in the NBA, the Continental Basketball Association (CBA), and the NBA Development League. He also played in France, in Italy, in Germany with Telekom Baskets Bonn, in Estonia with BC Kalev/Cramo and in Spain with Ford Burgos.

Johnson was selected by the Miami Heat in the 2nd round of the 2001 NBA Draft with the 48th pick overall. He played for the Dakota Wizards of the Continental Basketball Association (CBA) during the 2001–02 season and was selected to the CBA All-Defensive and All-Rookie Teams. He played 16 games of one NBA season (2002-03), averaging 2.0 points and 2.0 rebounds per game. Johnson's final NBA game was on April 15th, 2003 in a 103 - 99 win over the Toronto Raptors where he came off the bench playing for 33 minutes and recorded 8 points, 10 rebounds, 1 steal and 1 block.

He was the first overall selection in the 2003 NBA Development League Draft.

See also
List of NCAA Division I men's basketball career blocks leaders
List of NCAA Division I men's basketball season blocks leaders

References

External links
Ken Johnson NBA profile @ NBA.com
Ken Johnson NBA Development League profile @ NBA.com
Ken Johnson NBA stats @ basketball-reference.com

1978 births
Living people
Albuquerque Thunderbirds players
American expatriate basketball people in China
American expatriate basketball people in Estonia
American expatriate basketball people in France
American expatriate basketball people in Germany
American expatriate basketball people in Italy
American expatriate basketball people in South Korea
American expatriate basketball people in Spain
American expatriate basketball people in Switzerland
American men's basketball players
Basketball players from Detroit
BC Kalev/Cramo players
Suwon KT Sonicboom players
Centers (basketball)
Dakota Wizards (CBA) players
Fribourg Olympic players
Huntsville Flight players
JL Bourg-en-Bresse players
Miami Heat draft picks
Miami Heat players
Ohio State Buckeyes men's basketball players
Skyliners Frankfurt players
Henry Ford High School (Detroit, Michigan) alumni
S.S. Felice Scandone players
Telekom Baskets Bonn players